Vengoor West is a village in the Ernakulam district of Kerala, India. It is located in the Kunnathunad taluk.

Demographics 

According to the 2011 census of India, Vengoor West has 4448 households. The literacy rate of the village is 87.23%.

Notable institutions 
Vengoor has 2 major religious centers one being the Mar Kauma Church which is one among the ancient churches of the Syrian Christians in Kerala, being established on 1870  and other being Vengoor Durga Devi temple.

References 

Villages in Kunnathunad taluk